Christianity is the third-largest practiced religion in Kerala, accounting for 18% of the population according to the Indian census. Although a minority, the Christian population of Kerala is proportionally much larger than that of India as a whole. A significant portion of the Indian Christian population resides in the state.

History 

The tradition of origin among Saint Thomas Christians relates to the arrival of Saint Thomas, one of the 12 disciples of Jesus at the ancient seaport Muziris on the Kerala coast in AD 52.

It is also possible for Aramaic-speaking Jews from Galilee to make a trip to Kerala in the 1st century. The Cochin Jews are known to have existed in Kerala around that time. 
 
The earliest known source connecting the apostle to India is the Acts of Thomas, likely written in the early 3rd century, perhaps in Edessa. The text describes Thomas' efforts in bringing Christianity to Northwest India, specifically in the Indo-Parthian Kingdom. 

According to traditional accounts such as the "Thomma Parvam" ("Song of Thomas"). Generally he is described as arriving in or around Maliankara and founding Seven Churches and half churches, or Ezharapallikal: Kodungallur, Kollam, Niranam, Nilackal (Chayal), Kokkamangalam, Kottakkavu, Palayoor , Thiruvithamcode Arappalli and Aruvithura church (half church). A number of 3rd- and 4th-century Roman writers also mention Thomas' trip to India, including Ambrose of Milan, Gregory of Nazianzus, Jerome, and Ephrem the Syrian, while Eusebius of Caesarea records that his teacher Pantaenus visited a Christian community in India in the 2nd century. There came into existence a Christian community who were mainly merchants. These sources link him solely to Northwestern India, and modern scholars agree there is no evidence that Thomas visited South India at any point, and that he ultimately met his demise in the Indo-Parthian Kingdom.

Denominations

The 2011 Indian census found a total of 6,411,269 Christians in Kerala, with their various denominations as stated: Saint Thomas Christians (including multiple Catholic, Oriental Orthodox and Protestant bodies) constituted 70.73% of the Christians of Kerala, followed by Latin Catholics at 13.3%, Pentecostals at 4.3%, CSI at 4.5%, Dalit Christians at 2.6% and other Protestant groups (such as Lutheran, Calvinist and other charismatic churches) at 5.9%. 

The Saint Thomas Christians (Nasrani) of Kerala primarily belong to the churches which use the East Syriac Rite (Syro-Malabar Catholic Church and Chaldean Syrian Church) and West Syriac Rite (Jacobite Syrian Christian Church, Malankara Orthodox Syrian Church, Mar Thoma Syrian Church, St. Thomas Evangelical Church of India, Syro-Malankara Catholic Church and the Malabar Independent Syrian Church). The Church of South India belongs to the Anglican Communion and Saint Thomas Anglicans are theologically and liturgically similar to Anglicans elsewhere. Pentecostal Saint Thomas Christians, like other Pentecostals, are riteless (nonliturgical). , Saint Thomas Christians composed 12.5% of the total population of Kerala.
 The Malankara Marthoma Syrian Church and St. Thomas Evangelical Church of India are Oriental Protestant churches. The Salvation Army also maintains a presence in Kerala.

In 2016, 61% of Christians in the state were Catholics, which includes the Eastern Catholics and Latin Catholic. The percentage of Catholics among Christians is the highest in Thrissur district. 

Major Pentecostal denominations in Kerala include the India Pentecostal Church of God, Assemblies of God in India, Church of God (Full Gospel) in India, and The Pentecostal Mission.

See also
 Caste system among South Asian Christians
 Goan Catholics
 East Indian Catholics
 Mangalorean Catholics

References

Further reading
George K.M.,`Christianity in India Through the Centuries`,Authentic Books, Secunderabad,2007,2009.().
Benedict Vadakkekara,`Origin of Christianity in India`,Media House, Delhi,2007..
Agur C.M.,`Church History of Travancore`,Madras,1903 Reprint:Asian Educational Services, New Delhi,1990..
Visvanathan Susan,`The Christians of Kerala`,Oxford University Press, Delhi1993,1999.()
George Menachery,`The St. Thomas Christian Encyclopaedia of India`,SARAS,Ed.Prof. George Menachery, Ollur,Vol.I 1982, Vol.II 1973, Vol. III 2009.
George Menachery,`Indian Church History Classics`,SARAS,Ed.Prof. George Menachery, Ollur,Vol.I The Nazranies 1998.
C. I. Issac, The Evolution of Christian Church in India,  2014, Soorygatha Publishers, PB No 3517, Kochi 682 035